The  long Suså River (Susåen), Zealand's largest waterway and longest river, runs into Lake Tystrup, the 8th largest lake in Denmark.

Rivers of Zealand